Abantia may refer to:
 ABANTIA, a Spanish engineering company
 Amantia, ancient Greek polis in Epirus